KEII (690 AM) is a commercial radio station in Blackfoot, Idaho, broadcasting to the Idaho Falls-Pocatello, Idaho area.  The station airs a variety hits format branded as Cannonball 101.

KEII is a division of Riverbend Communications LLC., which is owned by Frank L. VanderSloot.

History

KTII was first licensed, as KBLI, in 1951, to the Blackfoot Broadcasting Company, with 250 watts on 1490 kHz. In 1957 the station moved to 690 kHz, and in 1991 the call letters were changed to KECN.

Expanded Band assignment

On March 17, 1997, the Federal Communications Commission (FCC) announced that eighty-eight stations had been given permission to move to newly available "Expanded Band" transmitting frequencies, ranging from 1610 to 1700 kHz, with KECN authorized to move from 690 to 1620 kHz. The expanded band station was assigned the call letters KBLI on November 10, 1997.

The FCC's initial policy was that both the original station and its expanded band counterpart could operate simultaneously for up to five years, after which owners would have to turn in one of the two licenses, depending on whether they preferred the new assignment or elected to remain on the original frequency, although this deadline was extended multiple times. It was ultimately decided to remain on the original frequency, and the license for KBLI on 1620 kHz was cancelled on February 7, 2006.

Later history

The call letters of the original station on 690 kHz were changed to KZNR in 2001, and KSLJ in 2004. Following the deletion of the expanded band operation on 1620 kHz in 2006, the KBLI call sign was returned to 690 kHz. On October 21, 2014, the call letters became KEII.

On September 10, 2018 KEII and simulcaster KEIR 1260 Idaho Falls (under new KNBL calls) changed their format from religious to variety hits, branded as "Cannonball 101".

References

External links

 FCC History Cards for KEII (covering 1950-1980 as KBLI) 

EII
Radio stations established in 1951
1951 establishments in Idaho
Adult hits radio stations in the United States